Chandler Ward  is a Brisbane City Council ward covering Chandler, Burbank, Carindale, Gumdale, Mackenzie, Mansfield, Ransome, Rochedale, and parts of Belmont and Wakerley.

Councillors for Chandler Ward

Results

References

City of Brisbane wards
Brisbane localities